Anita is a 2021 Hong Kong biographical musical drama film about Cantopop star Anita Mui directed by Longman Leung, with a script written by Leung and Jack Ng. Louise Wong, in her screen role debut, stars as the titular singer, depicting her life from childhood until her last moments before her death of cervical cancer in 2003. The film features an ensemble cast, including Fish Liew, Gordon Lam and Louis Koo in supporting roles.

Production of the biopic began in the 2010s when Bill Kong, president of Edko Films, initiated the project to commemorate Mui's legacy. Leung signed on the project and took over a year to write the script with Ng, as well as finalize the cast. Principal photography took place in 2018.

Although its initial 2020 release date was delayed due to COVID-19 pandemic, Anita was released in Hong Kong on 12 November 2021, followed by some Southeast Asia countries in the same month. The film received mixed to positive reviews, and made its HK$12M box-office debut with previous preview screenings.

An extended director's cut, featuring 1 hour of extra footage, was released digitally as five-episode miniseries on Disney+ through Star starting from 2 February 2022.

Plot
The film follows the life of Hong Kong Cantopop singer and actress Anita Mui. The film begins from her life as a child performer with her sister Ann Mui in the now-demolished Lai Chi Kok Amusement Park, and follows her relationship with her fashion designer Eddie Lau, fellow singer Leslie Cheung,  ex-boyfriends Goto Yuki and Ben Lam, her career and up till Mui's death in 2003.

Cast
 Louise Wong as Anita Mui
 Ayumu Nakajima as Anita's ex-boyfriend / Japanese entertainer Goto Yuki, which is based on Japanese singer Masahiko Kondō
 Tony Yang as her second ex-boyfriend Ben Lam (Cantonese dubbed version by Gabriel Harrison)
 Louis Koo as the fashion designer Eddie Lau
 Gordon Lam as the executive So Haau Leung with Capital Artists
 Miriam Yeung as Florence Chan, a talent agent with Capital Artists 
 Fish Liew as Anita's sister, Ann Mui
 Terrance Lau as Leslie Cheung
 David Siu as triad-affiliated film investor Boss Kwok, which is based on 14K-affiliated film producer Wong Long-wai
 Waise Lee as film producer Leonard Ho

Production

Development 
Hong Kong film producer Bill Kong had pushed for the making of a biographical film of his friend, whom he had struck a friendship with during the 1980s. He attributes his devotion as the film's producer and biggest investor to be a returned favor for when Mui helped his then-fledgling film company, Edko, promote The Adventures of Milo and Otis in Hong Kong. Years later, Mui had asked Kong to help her get an impactful, memorable movie role in return, and he had her lined up to star in House of Flying Daggers before her death. Regretful that the singer died before the film's production, Kong thought about producing a biopic about Mui's life for over a decade. However, he had difficulties finding an appropriate script for the project, and could not find a suitable actress to play Mui.

Determined to bring the project to life, Kong decided to approach Longman Leung in 2015 about the biopic project. Kong initially wanted to work with screenwriter Lilian Lee, who had written the screenplay for Rouge, which Mui starred in. However, Lee turned the offer down. Leung wrote an initial synopsis, conducted a year of interviews with Mui's inner circle, and developed a script with co-writer Jack Ng.

Casting 
For Anita, Leung took notes on how historical drama The Crown portrayed its subject matter. He was inspired by the television series' focus on casting actors for their ability to evoke a historical figure's personality. Casting calls for the film began in late 2016, with Kong and Leung spending a year deliberating on who should play Mui. According to Leung, the production team auditioned over 3000 actors during the process. After multiple rounds of auditions, the team eventually decided to cast model Louise Wong in her first film role. In her auditions, Wong performed a Cantonese nanyin song, a wenxi Chinese opera performance, the theme from Rouge, and Anita Mui’s song “Life Written in Water” (似水流年). According to Kong, the production team were moved to tears by Wong's performance during her final audition, where she sang Mui's "Sunset Melodies" (夕陽之歌) in a full dress rehearsal of the film's final scene. Wong was initially stunned by her casting, as she had never considered becoming an actress. After coming to terms with the magnitude of the role, she began training in acting and performance for six months.

In addition to Wong, the production team cast Louis Koo to play fashion designer Eddie Lau, and Gordon Lam as pianist-friend So Hau Leung. For the role of Leslie Cheung, the production team went with Terrance Lau, who was positively received for his work in the 2019 romantic drama Beyond the Dream. While he eventually accepted the part, Lau nearly turned the opportunity down due to the pressure he felt of portraying Cheung.

Filming 
Anita entered production in 2018, with principal photography lasting 80 days. As the movie depicted scenes mostly in 1980s Hong Kong, the production crew secured permissions to film in Hong Kong landmarks, such as the Hong Kong Coliseum before its renovation and Hong Kong Stadium. Leung, who had previously directed effects-heavy action films, used his post-production experience to leverage computer-generated Imagery to produce settings of the past. The Hong Kong visual effects company, Free-D workshop, was tasked with recreating various Hong Kong landmarks from the 80s and 90s. The visual effects team worked with the art team to reconstruct demolished buildings like the Lee Theatre, or places where the scenery had changed a lot, such as the East Tsim Sha Tsui waterfront.

Filming in Thailand took place ostensibly in a secluded villa called Lanna Hill House, in the Mae-On district of Chiang Mai. 

Although Leung had members of his crew dedicated to obtaining the rights to Mui's music from the company that held them, he still found difficulty finding existing masters of her recordings and was only able to locate four originals. Taking inspiration from the recording process of the biopic Bohemian Rhapsody, Leung's audio team blended vocal tracks of Mui, Wong, and a session singer in order to recreate Mui's singing style.

After getting feedback from friends in the industry, the cast and crew did an additional 10-day shoot in 2019. The film was in post-production during the COVID-19 pandemic in Hong Kong.

Release

Marketing 
The first trailer and poster for Anita was released in May 2021. However, Wong's involvement with the project was kept a mystery until 8 July 2021, when she was officially announced as the actor to be portraying Mui.

Following the film's release, Edko Films would continue to promote Anita by offering free tram rides in Hong Kong on the 18th anniversary of Mui's death on 30 December.

Box office 
Anita had its world premiere as the last film shown at the 2021 Busan International Film Festival. The film was released on 12 November 2021 in Hong Kong and mainland China. Sony Pictures Releasing and Buena Vista International will distribute the film in five Asian countries, Malaysia, Singapore, Taiwan, Thailand and Vietnam by the end of 2021. The film topped the box office in Hong Kong upon release, and debuted second at the Chinese box office with $6.3 million in ticket sales and earning more than 10 million yuan on its opening day.

On 5 January 2022, Disney announced that an episodic adaptation of Anita would be available on Disney+ Star content starting on 2 February of that year. The series, titled Anita (Director's Cut), is composed of five 45-minute long episodes. It rearranges existing scenes and contains over an hour of unreleased footage.

On 6 January 2022, the film was screened in Thailand nationally.

Reception
Richard Kulpers of Variety wrote, "Longman Leung’s nostalgic drama has a soft center but should still please the late star’s worldwide legion of fans. Edmund Lee of South China Morning Post wrote, "There are notable – and understandable – omissions. While the film elaborates on Mui’s ultimately futile romantic relationships and highlights her charitable endeavors, it shies away from mentioning her fabled political activism in the aftermath of the Tiananmen Square crackdown in 1989. Mui’s bloodsucking mother and brothers – a key part of her tragic backstory – are also conspicuously absent."

Accolades

References

Hong Kong biographical films
2021 films
2021 biographical drama films
2021 drama films
2020s Cantonese-language films
Biographical films about singers
Biographical films about actors
Drama films based on actual events
Films about cancer
Films about suicide
Films set in the 1970s
Films set in the 1980s
Films set in the 1990s
Films set in the 2000s
Films set in Hong Kong
Films shot in Hong Kong
Midlife crisis films
Star (Disney+) original programming